= Rose Schnitzer Tower =

High-rise apartment building in Portland, Oregon, U.S.

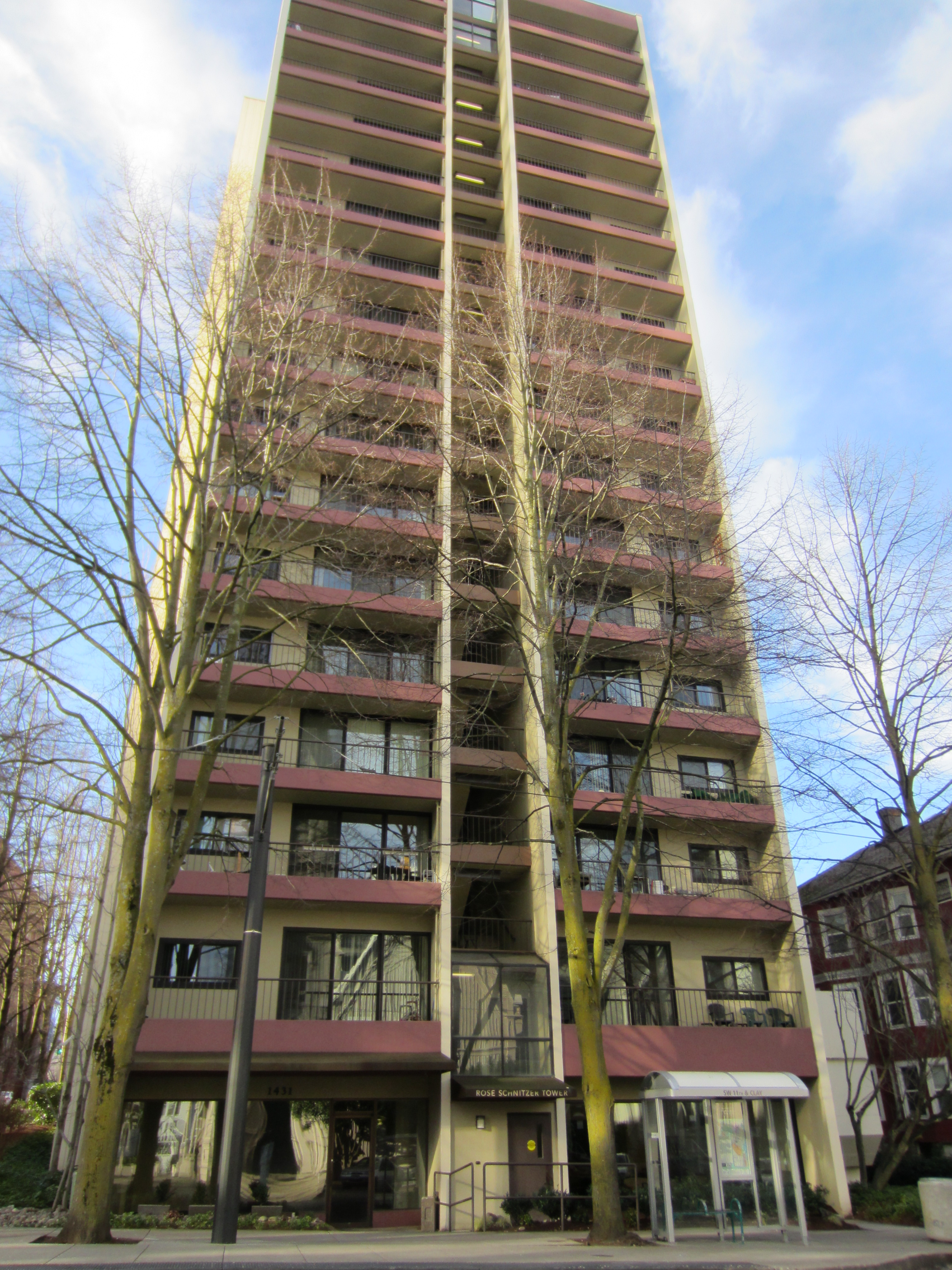
- The building's exterior in 2012
- Interactive map of the Rose Schnitzer Tower area

General information
- Location: Portland, Oregon, United States
- Coordinates: 45°30′55″N 122°41′11″W
- Completed: 1980

Height
- Height: 214.67 feet (65.43 m)

Technical details
- Floor count: 17

Rose Schnitzer Tower is a high-rise apartment building in Portland, Oregon.
